John Douglas "Rabbit" Bundrick (born November 21, 1948) is an American keyboardist, pianist and organist. He is best known for his work with the rock band The Who and associations with others including Eric Burdon, Bob Marley and the Wailers, Roger Waters, Free and Crawler. Bundrick is noted as the principal musician for the cult film The Rocky Horror Picture Show. In the mid-1970s, he was a member of the short-lived group Mallard, formed by ex-members of Captain Beefheart's Magic Band. He is also known as a composer and has recorded solo albums. He was also a member of the Texas group Blackwell, who had a hit single in 1969 entitled "Wonderful".

Biography

Kossoff, Kirke, Tetsu and Rabbit
In 1971, Bundrick recorded and wrote five tracks for the album Kossoff Kirke Tetsu Rabbit  with guitarist Paul Kossoff, drummer Simon Kirke and bassist Tetsu Yamauchi.

Johnny Nash and Bob Marley
Bundrick toured and recorded with Texan vocalist Johnny Nash. Bundrick played on Nash's hit single and album "I Can See Clearly Now" (1972). He met Bob Marley while in Sweden, while working on the soundtrack to the Swedish film Vill så gärna tro. Marley, Bundrick, and Johnny Nash became roommates there during the stay. Sometime after their return to London, Bundrick was brought in to collaborate on arrangements for Marley's Catch a Fire album, adding keyboards to the original Jamaican recordings to make the record more accessible to listeners.
Around this time, Bundrick also worked with Chris Blackwell of Island Records, appearing on recordings by the company.

Free
In 1972 the members of Free reformed joined by Bundrick on keyboards. They recorded Free's final album Heartbreaker, which included "Muddy Water" and "Common Mortal Man" by Bundrick, who was also credited for collaborations on two other tracks. After a brief period of touring Free broke up.

Pete Townshend and The Who

Bundrick first worked with Pete Townshend in 1977 when he performed on Rough Mix, Townshend's collaboration with Ronnie Lane, former bass player for Small Faces and Faces. He was invited to play on the Who's album Who Are You (1978), but broke his arm falling out of a taxi at the studio door and was unable to participate in recording sessions. Bundrick toured with The Who from 1979 to 1981 along with drummer Kenney Jones and played on their album Face Dances (1981), then briefly parted with the band during the recording of It's Hard (1982) and the subsequent tour. Bundrick later rejoined the band performing with them at Live Aid in 1985 and played live with them until 2012.

Bundrick played on the Who's single  "Real Good Looking Boy" and "Old Red Wine" in 2004, and on their album Endless Wire (2006) and joined the band for The Who Tour 2006–2007, appearing in the summer and fall concerts. He missed the start of the second leg of the North American tour due to the illness of his wife Sue; keyboard technician Brian Kehew took keyboard duties. Townshend said at the time that Sue was "very close to the end, and [Rabbit] will be back with us when she's gone".

2008–present
In the spring of 2008, Bundrick married Canadian Jody Ahern. On July 12, 2008, he performed at the recording of VH1 Honors The Who in Los Angeles. He then worked with English alternative folk band Small Engine Repair and played on their track "This Whole Setup Is A Lie". In December 2009, it was announced he was working with the band Night Parade on their new album.

Bundrick performed with the Who for their Super Bowl XLIV halftime show in 2010. He played with the group in 2011 at a charity show but was replaced in the subsequent tours. Pete Townshend has commented that there ".. was an issue between Roger Daltrey and Rabbit."

Selected discography

1971 Kossoff Kirke Tetsu Rabbit
1972 Johnny Nash – I Can See Clearly Now
1972 Sandy Denny – Sandy
1973 Free – Heartbreaker
1973 Paul Kossoff – Back Street Crawler
1973 John Martyn –  Solid Air
1973 Bundrick – Broken Arrows
1973 Donovan – Cosmic Wheels
1974 Bundrick – Dark Saloon
1974 Kevin Ayers, John Cale, Nico, Eno – June 1, 1974
1974 Bryn Haworth – Let the Days Go By
1975 The Rocky Horror Picture Show
1975 Jim Capaldi – Short Cut Draw Blood
1975 Andy Fairweather Low – La Booga Rooga
1977 Joan Armatrading – Show Some Emotion
1977 Eric Burdon – Survivor
1977 Townshend & Lane – Rough Mix
1979 The Only Ones – Special View
1980 Pete Townshend – Empty Glass
1981 The Who – Face Dances
1985 Deep End – Deep End Live!
1988 Bundrick – Dream Jungle
1992 Roger Waters – Amused to Death
1999 Fairport Convention – Cropredy 98
2006 The Who – Endless Wire
2007 Mick Jagger – The Very Best of Mick Jagger (Deluxe Edition)
2008 David Byron – That Was Only Yesterday - The Last EP
2015 Elton Novara – Lei Ha Perso il Contatto con la Realtà 
2015 208 Talks of Angels – Made in Hell
2017 The Puss Puss Band - Echoes Across the Cruel Sea 
2019 Neil Hamburger - Still Dwelling

References

External links
www.rabbitwho.com

1948 births
Living people
American rock keyboardists
American organists
English rock keyboardists
English organists
British male organists
People from Houston
People from Finchley
Island Records artists
American expatriates in the United Kingdom
Free (band) members
Back Street Crawler (band) members
21st-century American keyboardists
21st-century organists
20th-century American keyboardists